Sarakhampittayakhom School is a public secondary school in Thailand. It is the main public high school and largest in Maha Sarakham Province, located around the central main town district or Amphoe Muang. The school admits Mathayom levels 1 to 6 (Grades 7-12).

It started in 1906 as a school for boys in the Positaram temple, then later was established as a formal coeducational school on July 10, 1913. The school gradually grew larger through the years and has now over 3,000 students.

The school has specialized programs for students such as the English Program (EP), with various subjects taught in the English Language by foreign teachers, Thai subjects, and a Gifted Program, which focuses on Math and Science subjects taught in Thai.

References

Schools in Thailand